Arup Manufacturing Corporation  was an American aircraft manufacturer of tailless aircraft.

History 

Dr. C.L. Snyder experimented with tailless aircraft starting with a 1926 glider called the Dirigiplane. The aircraft used a Clark Y airfoil that could be filled with helium gas to assist with lift. Snyder formed the Monowing corporation to further develop the aircraft. The design progressed into the Arup S-1 design and the formation of Arup Manufacturing.

In 1934, Snyder's chief engineer, Raoul J. Hoffman left the company to create a similar design, the Hoffman Flying Wing. His breakaway project ended with the crash of the prototype from an onboard fire.

Aircraft

References

Bibliography

Flying wings